Chris Shinn (born August 1, 1974) is an American singer, songwriter and musician. From March 2012 to December 2016, he was the lead singer of the band Live. He was previously the lead singer of the band Unified Theory. He is the son of former Charlotte Hornets owner, George Shinn.

Unified Theory

Beginnings 

Unified Theory began to form in early 1998. After the initial idea to continue Blind Melon with a new lead vocalist did not work out, Smith and Thorn decided to start a new band. Thorn discovered Shinn on a scouting mission in Los Angeles.

Unified Theory was originally called Luma, they issued a four-track CD through their website in 1999. After they were signed to Universal Records later that year, they changed their name to Unified Theory after the theory Albert Einstein was working on when he died.

Debut and demise 
In August 2000 the band issued their self-titled debut album. While working on tracks for a second album, delays set the band back, and Krusen grew somewhat frustrated and left to join Nickelback's first major North American tour as a touring musician, leading to Unified Theory's eventual breakup.

Brief Reformation & Reunion Show 
The band have since announced plans to release a new album consisting of the recorded material for the second album (some of which has never been heard) as well as songs from the Luma period. No timetable has been set for this release. Unified Theory has recently filmed a music video for the song "15 Hits", a song set to be released on their upcoming album. The group played a reunion show on August 4, 2010 at the King King in Hollywood.

Live 
On March 12, 2012, it was revealed that Chris would be the new lead singer of the rock band Live. He played the band's dress rehearsal show to a hometown crowd at the Strand-Capitol Theater in York, PA, on March 12, 2012. He toured with the band and performed on the band's 2014 album The Turn.

On December 12, 2016, Live announced that original lead singer Ed Kowalczyk had returned to the band, though no reference was made to Shinn in the announcement. All references to his tenure in the band have been removed from the band's website and The Turn is absent from the discography.

Discography

Singles

References

External links 
 Live's website

American rock singers
Living people
1974 births
Live (band) members
Alternative rock singers
Place of birth missing (living people)
21st-century American singers